North Hudson comprises the municipalities of Weehawken, Union City, West New York, Guttenberg and North Bergen in Hudson County, New Jersey. With a 2010 United States Census population of 201,000, the contiguous urban area, one of the most densely populated places in the nation, is largely situated atop the Palisades on the Hudson Waterfront of west bank of the Hudson River.

The area lies north of Hoboken and Jersey City across the river from Midtown Manhattan and Upper West Side in New York City and east of the New Jersey Meadowlands. Its high elevation of about  affords North Hudson expansive views of the Manhattan skyline to east and the Meadowlands, and beyond to the Watchung Mountains, to the west. Many of the tall buildings are part of string of residential high-rises that continues north along the Boulevard East-Palisade Avenue-River Road corridors into the  eastern Bergen County towns of  Cliffside Park, Edgewater and Fort Lee. Many of the buildings went up during a boom in development in the late 1960s and early 1970s.

Buildings over 

.

Notable towers

The White Brewery was built adjacent to Hudson Palisades, the site of today's Galaxy Towers in 1855. The 8-story building was destroyed in fire in1896.

The dome of Monastery and Church of Saint Michael the Archangel, built between 1866 and 1875, rises  .

In 1890, the North Hudson County Railway built an elevator tower and viaduct to connect with trains at Weehawken Terminal with its street car lines on top of the Palisades. With the closure of the Gutenberg Racetrack, traffic diminished and  the service discontinued.

The Hudson County Brewing Company headquarters and plant built circa 1901 in what was West Hoboken was demolished in the early 1930s and became the site of Roosevelt Stadium.

On November 8, 1956, the top of the tower was hit by a small aircraft, which knocked off the top and killed six people. It was later dismantled.

Sources
Emporis North Bergen
Emporis Guttenberg
Emporis West New York
Emporis Weehawken
Emporis Union City

References

Tallest
North Hudson
Architecture in New Jersey
North Hudson
Towers in New Jersey
Tallest
Tallest
Tallest
Tallest
Tallest